The Sverdlov District is a district of the capital city of Bishkek in northern Kyrgyzstan. Its resident population was 214,100 in 2009. It covers the northeastern part of the city, including the residential area Krasny Stroitel.

Demographics

Ethnic composition
According to the 2009 Census, the ethnic composition (residential population) of the Sverdlov District was:

References 

Districts of Kyrgyzstan
Bishkek